Shileh Goshad (also Romanized as Shīleh Goshād) is a village in Pain Rokh Rural District, Jolgeh Rokh District, Torbat-e Heydarieh County, Razavi Khorasan Province, Iran. At the 2006 census, its population was 156, in 33 families, 4.7 people per family.

References 

Populated places in Torbat-e Heydarieh County